Andrew Anderson (born May 10, 1995) of Holly, Michigan is a right-handed American professional ten-pin bowler known for winning the 2018 USBC Masters. He competes in events on the PBA Tour and in global events as a member of Team USA. In his second full season on the PBA Tour (2018), Anderson won the Chris Schenkel PBA Player of the Year Award.

Anderson has won three PBA Tour titles, including one major championship. He is a member of the Turbo grips pro staff. He was also a pro staff member for Ebonite, moving to Brunswick after the latter purchased the former in 2019. In January 2022, Anderson signed with MOTIV Bowling.

Amateur career
Anderson bowled collegiately at Davenport University in Grand Rapids, Michigan where he earned 2014 Collegiate Rookie of the Year honors. He completed a Bachelor's degree in elementary education at Oakland University. He was a three-time member of Junior Team USA, and became a member of Team USA in 2018.

At the 2018 World Bowling Tour Men's Championships in Hong Kong (held November 24–December 5), Anderson won a gold medal in trios with teammates Kyle Troup and E. J. Tackett.

Anderson was part of the rotating four-person team (with A. J. Johnson, Jakob Butturff and Kristopher Prather) that won the trios gold medal for Team USA at the 2021 International Bowling Federation (IBF) Super World Championships in Dubai.

Professional career
Anderson won one PBA Regional Tour title as a non-member. He became a full-time PBA Tour bowler in 2017, participating in 16 national tour events and making one championship round, where he finished third. He also won another PBA Regional Tour title in 2017, his first as a PBA member.

In February 2018, he qualified as the #2 seed for the PBA Tournament of Champions, but was defeated in the semifinal match (his first television appearance) by the eventual winner, Matt O'Grady.

Anderson qualified as the #1 seed (out of 360 players) at the 2018 USBC Masters, and won his lone match in the televised finals on April 15 to earn his first national PBA Tour title and first major championship. Anderson won his second PBA Tour title on June 3, 2018 at the PBA Greater Jonesboro Open. In October 2018, he finished runner-up in two of the three FloBowling PBA Fall Swing events: the PBA Wolf Open and the PBA Tulsa Open.

On November 20, 2018, the PBA announced that Anderson won the 2018 Chris Schenkel PBA Player of the Year award. At 23, Anderson is the second-youngest player in history to win the award, behind Billy Hardwick who won the 1963 POY award at age 22. In addition to his two season titles and three other top-five finishes, Anderson won the Harry Smith PBA Points Leader award while ranking in the top five in tour earnings and scoring average.

Anderson took a step back in 2019, in part due to a hand injury he suffered in Hong Kong at the end of 2018. He mentioned on the 2019 PBA Tour Finals broadcast (July 19) that the hand bothered him for several months, forcing him to alter his delivery. He made just three final round appearances in 2019 and did not win a title.

Through 2019, Anderson has recorded one 300 game in PBA competition.

On March 14, 2021, Anderson won his third PBA Tour title (with partner Kris Prather) at the Roth-Holman PBA Doubles Championship. On June 18, 2021 (broadcast July 11), Anderson out-dueled 11 other pros to win the non-title PBA Strike Derby.

PBA Tour titles
Major championships are in bold text.

 2018 USBC Masters (Syracuse, New York)
 2018 PBA Greater Jonesboro Open (Jonesboro, Arkansas)
 2021 Roth-Holman PBA Doubles Championship w/Kris Prather (Tampa, Florida)

PBA non-title victories
 2021 PBA Strike Derby (Portland, Maine)

Career statistics

Statistics are through the last complete PBA Tour season.

+CRA = Championship Round Appearances

Awards and honors
 2014 Collegiate Rookie of the Year
 2018 Chris Schenkel PBA Player of the Year
 2018 Harry Smith PBA Points Leader Award

Personal
When not competing on the PBA Tour or internationally, Anderson is a coach at Turbo Tech in Chesterfield, Michigan. He enjoys outdoor activities such as boating, fishing, camping and golfing. With the 2021 PBA Tour Finals being contested in Allen Park, Michigan, not far from Anderson's home in Holly, Andrew appeared as a laneside reporter for CBS Sports Network during the five hours of live coverage on June 27.

References

American ten-pin bowling players
1995 births
Living people